Blondel was an album released by the band Amazing Blondel in 1973. It is the first album without the founding member John David Gladwin, and features Steve Winwood on bass, and Simon Kirke of the Free on drums. In one song (Weavers Market) the lead singer of Free and Bad Company, Paul Rodgers appears as a vocal accompanist.

Track listing
All tracks written by Edward Baird

Island Records – ILPS 9257, 1973

Edsel Records – EDCD 460, 1995

Musicians
 Edward Baird – Vocals, guitar
 Terence Alan Wincott – Vocals, guitar, percussion, flute, crumhorn, piano, recorder
 Adrian Hopkins – Harpsichord, string arrangements
 Steve Winwood – Bass
 Simon Kirke – Drums
 Jack La Roche – String conductor

 Additional Musicians
 Sue Glover – Vocal accompaniment (tracks: B3, B4 and B5)
 Sunny Leslie – Voice accompaniment (tracks: B3, B4 and B5)
 Paul Rodgers – Vocal accompaniment (only in the song: B4)

References

Amazing Blondel albums
1973 albums
Island Records albums